Mansoura or (al-)Mansura is a word meaning victorious. This general form summarizes all possible ways of writing the word in Latin script.

It is a common name for different places in many countries. The largest city with that name is the Mansoura of Egypt which is the capital city of Dakahlia Governorate with a population of 960,423. Mansoura may also refer to:

Algeria
Mansoura, Tlemcen, a village in Tlemcen Province, Algeria
Mansoura, Ghardaïa, a village in Ghardaïa Province, Algeria
Mansourah, Mostaganem
Mansourah District (Ghardaïa Province)
Mansourah District (Tlemcen Province) 
Mansourah District (Bordj Bou Arréridj Province)

Cyprus
Mansoura, Cyprus, an abandoned village in Cyprus

Iran
 Mansureh-ye Kanin
 Mansureh-ye Mazi
 Mansureh-ye Olya
 Mansureh-ye Sadat

Libya
Mansura, Libya, a town in Libya

Morocco
Mansoura, Morocco, a town in Morocco

Pakistan
Mansoorah, Lahore, a suburb of Lahore, headquarters of Jamat-e-Islami.

Palestine
Depopulated during the 1948 Arab-Israeli War
Al-Mansura, Acre, 29 km northeast of Acre
Al-Mansura, Khirbat, 18.5 km southeast of Haifa
Al-Mansura, Ramla, 10 km south of Ramle
Al-Mansura, Safad, 31 km northeast of Safad
Mansurat al-Khayt,  11.5 km east of Safad
Al-Mansura, Tiberias, 16 kilometres northwest of Tiberias

Saudi-Arabia
Al-Mansorah, Saudi-Arabia

Spain
Almanzora (disambiguation)

Syria
 Mansura, Hama, a village in Syria
 Al-Mansurah, Raqqa Governorate
 Al-Mansoura, Rif Dimashq
 Mansoura Subdistrict, Raqqa

Tunisia
El-Mansoura, Tunisia, small Tunisian village near Kelibia
Mansoura, Tunisia, town situated 8 km from Souassi and el Djem

United States
Mansura, Louisiana, a town in Avoyelles Parish, Louisiana, United States

Yemen
Al-Mansoura (Aden), a city district in Yemen

Historical places
Mansura, Sindh, ruined city near Shahdadpur, Pakistan

See also 
Mansouri
Mansuri (disambiguation)
Mansouria (disambiguation)